A Gentleman: Sundar, Susheel, Risky is a 2017 Indian Hindi-language action film written and directed by Raj & DK. The film stars Sidharth Malhotra in a dual role with Jacqueline Fernandez and Suniel Shetty. Upon release, it was a commercial failure.

Plot
2017: Gaurav Kapoor works at a software firm, based in suburban Miami, who plans to marry his girl friend Kavya, but she prefers a man who is more adventurous and risk-loving. Gaurav tries to ask Kavya on a date and also meets her parents, who consider Gaurav as a potential groom for Kavya. Meanwhile, Gaurav is ordered by his boss to visit Mumbai to close a business deal. It is revealed that Gaurav is actually Rishi Purohit. 

2012: Rishi Purohit is a clandestine spy, working for a spy organization named Unit X headed by his superior Colonel Vijay Saxena. Rishi and his team attempt to extract intelligence from the Chinese Embassy in Bangkok. While escaping, Yakub-a teammate- shoots down an innocent civilian, which enrages Rishi. Rishi returns to Mumbai, where he talks to Vijay about retiring from the world of espionage. Vijay asks him to perform one last job for him, and this involves spying on a minister whom Colonel Vijay Saxena has between claims to be corrupt and ruthless and fraud man , and he wants to copy data from his cellphone into a hard drive which is wanted by Vijay. 

Rishi does save contents into the hard drive, but Colonel. Vijay, Saxena  having decided that Rishi is useless, instructs Yakub through a text message to kill him. Rishi senses the suspicion, and fights off Yakub and the other spies. Yakub manages to shoot Rishi, destroying the hard drive, but Rishi escapes and meets the real Gaurav Kapoor. Gaurav, who works in a cyber firm in Miami, has important data about the minister's connections. When Gaurav is murdered by Yakub on account of being a liability, Rishi decides to adopt Gaurav's identity to successfully escape from Yakub after his last mission.

2017: After being unintentionally recorded in a viral video and recognised by the members of Unit X, Gaurav/Rishi is soon attacked by Koko, an associate of Unit X's local contact Jignesh. He is forced to abduct and hide Koko in his car, which is noticed by his friend Dixit, who tries to help him and unintentionally kills Koko in the struggle. Yakub and other Unit X agents track Gaurav/Rishi down, and confront him, where he finally confesses, as Rishi, that he needed a life. Gaurav/Rishi is knocked down unconscious, and soon finds himself handcuffed with Kavya who had stopped by his house. Gaurav/Rishi uses his skills to escape with Kavya from the trouble, and ends up confessing to her about his past profession. 

Kavya berates Gaurav/Rishi, but later forgives him. Later that night, the two find themselves under fire after Unit X agents, headed by Yakub, raid the motel they are hiding in. Gaurav/Rishi hatches a quick scheme to retrieve the data, since the hard drive is damaged, and convinces Yakub to work with him on their final mission. Gaurav/Rishi executes the heist with success, but security guards notices and begin chasing Gaurav/Rishi. Yakub aborts the operation and abandons him. They meet at Gaurav/Rishi's house, where Rishi kills most of Yakub's henchmen with the help of Kavya. However, Gaurav/Rishi spares Yakub and two of his thugs and orders him to leave his house. 

Driving away in Gaurav/Rishi's car, Yakub realises that the hard drive Rishi gave is blank, and the car's trunk contains Koko's corpse. Working with Gaurav/Rishi, Dixit crashes into their car in a side collision, and police arriving on the scene discover the body. Yakub and his thugs are killed by the cops. Col. Vijay visits Gaurav/Rishi's house to confront him, but is killed in an explosion planned by Gaurav/Rishi. This neutralises Unit X, and Gaurav/Rishi and Kavya soon leave the city with new identities of Hemant and Pooja Khanna. Dixit buys machine guns from a local gun store in Miami before putting on a hoodie and walking away.

Cast
 Sidharth Malhotra as Gaurav Kapoor and Rishi Purohit (Double Role in Movie)
 Jacqueline Fernandez as Kavya Chetwani, Gaurav's girlfriend
 Suniel Shetty as Colonel Vijay Saxena 
 Darshan Kumaar as Yakub
 Hussain Dalal as Randeep Dixit, Gaurav's friend and colleague
 Rajit Kapur as Sameer Chetwani, Kavya's father
 Supriya Pilgaonkar as Ramika Chetwani, Kavya's mother
 Amit Mistry as Jignesh Patel
 Sijoy Varghese as Ramachandra Rao
 Shaheed Woods as Koko
 Kushal Punjabi as Willy
 Zachary Coffin as CEO Jim
 Hemant Koumar as Robbie
 Nikita Sachdev as Nikki 
 Sharad Malhotra

Production

Development

Siddharth Anand has stated that the movie was originally developed and envisioned to be a sequel to the 2014 film Bang Bang! However, the movie was later redeveloped to be a standalone, which was also confirmed in a later interview.

Filming
Filming began in mid-2016 under the working title Reloaded. In September 2016, it was reported that the international shooting schedule of A Gentleman: Sundar, Susheel, Risky had been canceled. Later it was revealed by a close source that "...there will be another long schedule in December but the location is yet to be finalised. It could be in Europe."

Soundtrack 

The music of the film is composed by Sachin–Jigar while the lyrics have been penned by Vayu and Priya Saraiya. Its first song, "Disco Disco", sung by Benny Dayal and Shirley Setia, was released on 17 July 2017.  The second song released, "Bandook Meri Laila", sung by Ash King and Jigar Saraiya and rapped by Raftaar and Sidharth Malhotra, was released on 24 July 2017. The song marks Malhotra's singing debut and was the most popular song on the album. The third song, "Baat Ban Jaye", sung by Siddharth Basrur and Priya Saraiya, was released on 5 August 2017. The fourth song was a romantic one, "Laagi Na Choote", and was another chartbuster. It was released on 13 August 2017. The last song, "Chandralekha", sung by Vishal Dadlani and Jonita Gandhi, was released on 24 August 2017. The soundtrack of five songs was released on 24 August 2017 by T-Series.

Critical reception

Domestic
Times of India rated the film 3.5 stars out of 5 and concluded, "The film would have been a perfect entertainer had it held its cards closer to its chest. However, it still has plenty bang for your buck."

Hindustan Times gave the film 3 out of 5, saying, "A Gentleman is not a flawless film... but Raj and DK have managed to narrate the plain and full-of-cliches story in their own quirky style and their dialogues and the screenplay make it fun to watch."

UAE
The movie released on 24 August in Dubai, UAE. Dollz in Dubai gave it 3.5 out of 5 stars calling it a masala entertainer and wrote "It's a big step for Siddharth Malhotra who manages to carry the film and commands the screen with his presence. Yes, he's good looking but he pulls off the action sequences really well."

References

External links
 
 
 

2017 films
2010s Hindi-language films
2017 action comedy films
2010s action adventure films
2010s adventure comedy films
2010s spy comedy films
Indian action comedy films
Indian action adventure films
Indian spy comedy films
Indian adventure comedy films
Fox Star Studios films
2017 masala films
Films shot in Mumbai
2017 comedy films
Films directed by Raj Nidimoru and Krishna D.K.